Christian Friedrich Sattler (1778–1842) was a brass instrument maker and inventor in Leipzig, Germany.
In Sattler's workshop in the Querstraße in Leipzig he built "signal horns and chromatic valve horns", new inventions at the time. He also built his own design of trombones with a wider bell flare and larger bore, that were widely adopted by players and other instrument makers, notably Czech maker Červený. Today, they are still known as "Leipzig model" or "German" trombones.

References 

German musical instrument makers

Brass instruments

1778 births

1842 deaths